Rhodotoxotis is a genus of moths belonging to the subfamily Olethreutinae of the family Tortricidae.

Species
Rhodotoxotis arciferana (Mabille, 1900)
Rhodotoxotis heteromorpha Diakonoff, 1992
Rhodotoxotis phylochrysa Diakonoff, 1992
Rhodotoxotis plutostola Diakonoff, 1992

See also
List of Tortricidae genera

References

External links
Tortricid.net

Tortricidae genera
Olethreutinae
Taxa named by Alexey Diakonoff